Trauma is a quarterly peer-reviewed medical journal that covers research in the field of emergency medicine. Its editors-in-chief are Ian Greaves (James Cook University Hospital) and Keith M Porter (Selly Oak Hospital). It was established in 1999 and is currently published by SAGE Publications in association with TraumaCare.

Abstracting and indexing 
Trauma is abstracted and indexed in Academic Search Premier, EMBASE, and SCOPUS.

External links 
 
 TraumaCare

SAGE Publishing academic journals
English-language journals
Emergency medicine journals